Rehal  may refer to:
 
Rehal (surname), name of multiple origins; includes people with the name
Rehal (book rest), a book rest for holy books

Places
Rehal Dhamalian, a village in Jammu and Kashmir, India
Rehal Kalandrian, a village in Jammu and Kashmir, India
Rehal, Rohtas, a hamlet in Bihar, India

See also
Riehl (disambiguation)
Rahal (disambiguation)
Rehali (disambiguation)
Rehala Falls, waterfalls in Himachal Pradesh
Rehalpura, a hamlet in Himachal Pradesh, India
Rehalkar, a settlement in Himachal Pradesh, India
Rehaliya , a settlement in Rajasthan, India
Reyhal, a place in Iran